Shahādā is a town in Nandurbar district of the Indian state of Maharashtra. It is a Municipal council.

History 

Under Maharao Jadavrao and Rao Shinde's of Dhanur, Shahada Village became part of West Khandesh in 1500s.

1400s to 1700s Shinde's became Rao of west Khandesh under Jadhavrao Rulers of Khandesh :-

The Shinde/Scindia (Sarpatils) of Khandesh. Who came from Amirgarh (Present in Rajasthan) as Rao of West Khandesh in and 14th century. In past they are Rai Amirgarh and ancestors of Sindh's Royal Family. They control Khandesh from Laling fort and Dhanur & Dhule Towns. In 1600s Jadhavrao lost ruling power against Mughal but after some time later Rao Shinde recaptured Khandesh with the help of Maratha Empire. In end of 1600s they came under Maratha Empire lead by Chhatrapati Sambhaji and after some year later they lost the Administrative and Ruler power against Mughal Empire lead by Aurangzeb in war.

Maratha rule 
Maratha raids into Khandesh began in 1670 with Shinde's Rao of West Khandesh and the following century was a period of unrest as Mughals and Marathas competed for control.  In 1760, the Peshwa ousted the Mughal ruler and gained control of Khandesh, following which portions were granted to Holkar and Shinde/Scindia rulers. Baji Rao II surrendered to the British in June 1818, but sporadic war continued in Khandesh which was among the last of the Peshwa's former territories to come under complete British control.

Prakasha village, which is around 15 km south-west of Shahada, is the second most important excavation site in Maharashtra. In 1955 B K Thapar on behalf of Archaeological Survey of India excavated site near confluence of Tapi River and Gomai River. Excavation exposed 17 meter deep occupational deposit – hammer stones, restricted use of copper, low grade bronze dating back to 1700 BC. Around 6 km north of Shahada there are several centuries old sculptures complex in Gomai River. The main sculpture is popularly known as Mahavir sculpture and the entire sculptures complex is popularly known as Pandavleni or 'Panch Pandav'. This evidence suggest that Shahada and area on the banks of Gomai River has been inhabited at least since 1700 BC. Shahada- municipality was established in the British period, in the year 1869.
Shahada and bhada are the two locations of this area situated on the river bank Gomai.These names observed in local gurjar language meaning saadha bhada means simple.
Pujya Sane Guruji Vidya prasarak mandal collage Lonkheda is the biggest educational campus near Shahada. Municipal school in Shahada is the oldest school since british Raj.

Demographics 

 India census, Shahada had a population of 61,376, being 52% male and 48% female. Shahada has an average literacy rate of 86.62%, higher than the national average of 74.04%: male literacy is 90.67%, and female literacy is 82.40%. In Shahada, 12.95% of the population is under 6 years of age. Languages/dialects spoken in Shahada town and Nandurbar districts are many  tribal language bhilu (ladshi, dogari, bayadi , pwari etc....) And other Marathi, and Gujarati.

Geography and climate 

Shahada is on average 455 feet above sea level. As the Satpura Mountain Range just 30 km north of Shahada, the bedrock is on an average 5 metres below the ground level. Due to natural or human-made caves, the ground at Savalde village, 5 km away from Shahada, caved in during heavy rain during August 2006 and caused an earthquake of magnitude 2.8 on Richter Scale on 10 November 2006. As seismograph stations are installed away from traffic to avoid false-positive results from ground vibrations, Shahada's seismograph station of the Sardar Sarovar Project is installed in the same village.

The soil above the bedrock is good for farming except in some areas. Average rainfall is 552 mm = 21.7 inches. The climate is hot for most of the year. Maximum temperature reaches up to 48 °C in summer and minimum temperature fall up to 9 °C in the winter. The climate of Shahada is on the whole dry except during the south-west monsoon season and winter months December to February. The year may be divided into four seasons. The cold season from December to February. Hot and dry season from March to June. The south-west monsoon season starts from the last week of June and last up to the end of September.

Transport 
As Ankleshwar-Burhanpur Highway passes through Shahada,it is well connected with satate transport buses & private buses.

Road: One can reach Shahada through Indore (84 km away), which is well connected with the Dhule–Nandurbar road. From Dhule, one can reach Shahada by going straight on the Mumbai-Agra highway NH-3 (National Highway) to Songir (Dhule) and at Songir turn left and you will be on MSH-1 (Maharashtra State Highway). The distance from Mumbai is approximately 424 km.
Railways: The nearest railway stations are Dondaicha (c. 28.6 km away) and Nandurbar (c. 35.6 km away). These stations are on Bhusawal-Surat Railway line. This line is used by people for going to or coming from Gujarat

Tourist attractions 
 Toranmal is nearby hill station.
 Unapdev is (24.9 km) from Shahada) is a picnic point in Shahada.   *【【Shivtirth 】】is best point at shahada

References 

Cities and towns in Nandurbar district